Franz Paulweber (born 6 January 1953) is an Austrian bobsledder. He competed in the two man and the four man events at the 1980 Winter Olympics.

References

1953 births
Living people
Austrian male bobsledders
Olympic bobsledders of Austria
Bobsledders at the 1980 Winter Olympics
Sportspeople from Tyrol (state)